Searching for Monica is a 1962 Argentine-Spanish black-and-white film musical film drama directed by José María Forqué. The film premiered on 29 January 1962 in Madrid and was named El Secreto de Mónica. It was first shown in Argentina on 29 March in Buenos Aires. It starred Alberto de Mendoza and Carmen Sevilla.

Cast

External links
 

Argentine musical drama films
Spanish drama films
1962 films
1960s Spanish-language films
Films directed by José María Forqué
1960s musical drama films
1962 drama films
1960s Argentine films